Basti is a small town in Achham District in the Seti Zone of western Nepal. According to the 1991 Nepal census, it has a population of 3282 and 693 houses in the village. At the time of the 2001 Nepal census, the population was 3601, of which 37% was literate.

References

Populated places in Achham District
Village development committees in Achham District